Fred A. Field (June 17, 1850 - April 18, 1935) was a businessman and public official from Vermont. Among the offices in which he served, Field was United States Marshal for the District of Vermont from 1898 to 1903.

Early life
Frederick A. Field (usually referred to as Fred A. Field) was born in Brandon, Vermont on June 17, 1850, a son of Minerva (Davenport) Field and William M. Field, who served as sheriff of Rutland County, a member of the Vermont Senate, and president of the Rutland Savings Bank. His family moved to Rutland in 1862 and Field was educated in the schools of Brandon and Rutland, and graduated from Burr and Burton Seminary in Manchester.

Start of career
Field began his career as a clerk in the Rutland post office and advanced to become Rutland's assistant postmaster from 1872 to 1884. From 1884 to 1885, he was a U.S. postal inspector, with responsibility for law enforcement and oversight of an eighteen-state district. In 1885, he was reappointed Rutland's assistant postmaster, and he served until 1889.

A Republican, Field served Rutland village as a school board member and village trustee. After Rutland was incorporated as a city, he served as its treasurer from 1894 to 1895. He was the chairman of Rutland's Republican committee, and secretary and chairman of the Rutland County committee.

From 1888 to 1893, Field served as Rutland's postmaster. In addition to his work for the post office, Field operated an investment brokerage, which dealt in stocks, bonds, and real estate.

A longtime civic activist, Fields' professional and fraternal memberships included the board of trustees of the Rutland Savings Bank and the Rutland Board of Trade, of which he was a charter member. Field was also a director of Rutland's People's Gas Light Company, treasurer of Rutland's Evergreen Cemetery, treasurer of the State Mutual Fire Insurance Company, and secretary of the Rutland Improvement League. In addition, he was also a member of the Masons, Knights of Pythias, and Elks.

U.S. Marshal
In 1898, Field was appointed U.S. Marshal for Vermont, succeeding Emory S. Harris. He served until 1903, and was succeeded on a temporary basis by Frank H. Chapman.

Field's commission was terminated by President Theodore Roosevelt on October 15, 1903. The termination resulted from a June 1903 incident in which he was accused of dereliction and neglect after three Chinese prisoners he was transporting effected an escape. Field argued that responsibility rested with the transportation company contracted to deport the prisoners, but when the incident became public knowledge, Field was removed from office.

After Field was removed, Vermont's federal district judge, Hoyt Henry Wheeler appointed Chapman, then serving as Field's chief deputy, to temporarily fill the vacancy. Chapman acted as marshal for five days, after which Horace W. Bailey was appointed as Field's permanent replacement. Bailey then reappointed Chapman as chief deputy.

Later life
After leaving office, Field was the principal of a Rutland real estate and insurance agency, Fred A. Field & Son. Despite his advanced age, he remained active in the business until a few weeks before his death. He maintained an interest in Rutland's civic life; in 1933 he was chairman of a Chamber of Commerce committee that successfully lobbied for construction of new federal building in Rutland.

Death and burial
Field died in Rutland on April 18, 1935. He was buried at Evergreen Cemetery in Rutland.

Family
In 1873, Field married Lillie Clark (1854-1942) of Rutland. They were the parents of three sons, Richard, William and Fred Jr.

Field's siblings included Henry F. Field, who served as Vermont State Treasurer from 1890 to 1898.

References

Sources

Books

Magazines

Newspapers

External links

1850 births
1935 deaths
People from Brandon, Vermont
People from Rutland (city), Vermont
Vermont Republicans
Vermont postmasters
United States Marshals
Burials at Evergreen Cemetery (Rutland, Vermont)